Jón Magnússon was Earl of Orkney in 1284–c. 1312.

Life

Jón Magnússon was the son of Magnus III of Orkney, and succeeded his brother to the Earldom of Orkney and Earldom of Caithness in 1284.  He was a signatory of the Treaty of Birgham/Salisbury in 1290, in which Margaret, Maid of Norway, was betrothed to Edward of Carnarfon. On 5 August 1296 he swore fealty to Edward I of England at Murkle, in Caithness.

References

Notes

Sources
Orkneyinga Saga, ed. Joseph Anderson, Edinburgh 1873.

Jon Magnusson
13th-century births
14th-century deaths
Mormaers of Caithness
13th-century mormaers
14th-century Scottish earls